Gimi George, better known by her stage name Miya George, or more commonly Miya, is an Indian actress and model who predominantly works in Malayalam films, along with a few Tamil films. She started her career as an actress by playing supporting roles in television shows.

She made her film debut by playing short roles in films such as Oru Small Family (2010), Doctor Love (2011) and Ee Adutha Kaalathu (2012). She was selected the Kerala Miss Fitness in 2012 and played her first lead role the same year in the Malayalam film Chettayees.

Early life and education 
Miya was born in Dombivli, Mumbai as a daughter to George Joseph & Mini George,In A Syro Malabar Catholic family where her father worked as an engineer. Later, at the age of four, she moved to Pala in Kottayam. She did her schooling from Sacred Heart Girls High School, Bharananganam and St. Mary's Higher Secondary School, Bharananganam. She completed B.A. degree from Alphonsa College, Palai and her Masters in English Literature at St. Thomas College, Palai. She has one elder sister, Gini, who is married to Lijo George and is settled in Bangalore. On 12 September 2020, Miya married businessman Ashwin Philip at St. Mary's Basilica Church, Ernakulam in a simple ceremony due to COVID-19 restrictions. They had a son in July 2021.  Her father George Joseph died two months later on 21 September 2021.

Career 
She started her career by playing supporting roles in the television serials Alphonsamma and Kunjali Marakkar. She wain the films Doctor Love and Ee Adutha Kaalathu. She rose to fame when she was chosen the Kerala Miss Fitness 2012 in a beauty pageant. She made her debut as a heroine through the film Ettekaal Second but the project got a commercial release in the year 2014. Actress Urmila Unni who played Miya's mother in this film suggested her to director Shajoon Kariyal who cast her to play the lead role in his 2012 comedy film Chettayees. She played the wife of the character played by Biju Menon which won her critical acclaim. Miya was then seen in the Mohanlal-starrer Red Wine in which she played the lead opposite Asif Ali. She played the role of an investigative journalist in Jeethu Joseph's Memories which turned out to be a major hit of the year 2013. The same year she appeared as a Christian nun thrown out of the church inVishudhan. In 2014, she appeared in veteran director Joshiy's Salaam Kashmier in which she played the lead role alongside Jayaram and Suresh Gopi and B. Unnikrishnan's Mr. Fraud in which she paired with Mohanlal. She also appeared in Lal Jr.'s psychological thriller Hi I'm Tony in which she paired opposite Asif Ali for the second time, George Varghese's 6B Paradise, and K. N. Sasidharan's Nayana which had her playing the mother of a young girl. She made her debut in Tamil with Jeeva Shankar's Amara Kaaviyam in which she played a character called Karthika. In 2015 she had done 32aam Adhyayam 23aam Vaakyam.

Filmography

Television

Serials
Sreekrishnan (Surya TV)
Ene Alphonsamma (Asianet) 
Kunjali Marakkar (Asianet)
Alphonsamma (Shalom TV)
Velankanni Mathavu (Surya TV)
Vishudha Chavara Achan (Flowers) 
Viswasthan  (Green TV) - telefilm

Mentor
Malayali Veettamma (Flowers (TV channel)
Red Carpet (Amrita TV)
Star Magic (Flowers (TV channel)
Funs Up On A Time 2 (Amrita TV)

 Host
Bhima Jewels Comedy Festival (Mazhavil Manorama)

Judge 
Bhima Jewels Comedy Festival (Mazhavil Manorama)
Comedy Stars season 2 ( Asianet )
Katturumbu (Flowers )
 Flowers top singer (Flowers )
D5 Junior (Mazhavil Manorama)
Surya Super Jodi No.1 (Surya TV)
 Top singer Star night (Flowers ) 
Dance Kerala Dance Season 2 (Zee Keralam)
Drama Juniors(Zee Keralam)
Music album
Final Over (YouTube)

Participant
 Sell Me the Answer  ( Asianet )
 Ningalkkum Aakaam Kodeeshwaran ( Asianet )
 Paryam Nedam (Amrita TV)
 Bzinga (Zee Keralam)
 Flowers Oru Kodi  (Flowers)

References

External links 

 

21st-century Indian actresses
Indian film actresses
Indian television actresses
Female models from Mumbai
Actresses in Malayalam cinema
Actresses from Kerala
People from Pala, Kerala
Living people
Actresses in Malayalam television
Female models from Kerala
Actresses in Tamil cinema
Actresses in Telugu cinema
1992 births